Erigophantes is a monotypic genus of Indonesian dwarf spiders containing the single species, Erigophantes borneoensis. It was first described by J. Wunderlich in 1995, and has only been found on Borneo.

See also
 List of Linyphiidae species (A–H)

References

Linyphiidae
Monotypic Araneomorphae genera
Spiders of Asia